William Waller (1898 – after 1923) was an English professional association footballer who played as an inside forward. He played in the Football League for Nelson, Burnley and Queens Park Rangers.

References

1898 births
Footballers from Bolton
English footballers
Association football inside forwards
Nelson F.C. players
Burnley F.C. players
Queens Park Rangers F.C. players
English Football League players
Year of death missing